Erik Rasmussen may refer to:

Erik N. Rasmussen (born 1957), American atmospheric scientist and tornado expert
Erik Rasmussen (ice hockey) (born 1977), ice hockey player
Erik Rasmussen (footballer) (born 1960), former Danish football player and manager
Erik Veje Rasmussen (born 1959), former Danish handball player